Saraswati Chaudhary is a Nepali politician in the Nepali Congress. She is a member of the Province No. 2 Provincial Assembly.

References

Living people
Year of birth missing (living people)
Nepali Congress politicians from Madhesh Province
21st-century Nepalese women politicians
21st-century Nepalese politicians
People from Janakpur
Members of the Provincial Assembly of Madhesh Province
Members of the 1st Nepalese Constituent Assembly